Johann(es) Fleck (Latinised: Flaccus, (1559 in Zwickau – 30 July 1628 in Küstrin) was a German Lutheran pastor, superintendent and court and cathedral preacher.

Life 
The son of the physician Matthäus Fleck, the first city physician of Berlin and his wife Regina Schirmer, he studied at the University of Leipzig, where he earned the academic degree of magister. There, he married the widow Susanna Weinhorst on 27 February 1587.

On 5 April 1596, he was appointed inspector (superintendent) at the Marienkirche in Prenzlau. The capital of the Uckermark offered the convinced Lutheran an ideal field of activity. "He gave the house of God the new name of the churches of the Holy Trinity, since it had now been taken from the (papal) Antichrists and given to God the Lord".

In 1601, Joachim Frederick, Elector of Brandenburg appointed him as court and cathedral preacher in Berlin. In this capacity, he preached the inaugural sermon (which has survived in print) at the newly founded Joachimsthalsches Gymnasium in 1607. Under John Sigismund, Elector of Brandenburg, Fleck was transferred to Küstrin as inspector (superintendent) in 1611. When this elector converted to the Calvinism, Fleck polemicised fiercely against it and prophesied the downfall of his sovereign and his chancellor , "as it had been for the then Saxon elector and his chancellor around 1590 because of their Calvinism".

In his second marriage, Fleck was married to Ursula Heerwig. He died on 30 July 1628 in Küstrin.

References

Further reading 
 Reinhold Grünberg, Sächsisches Pfarrerbuch, Freiberg 1940
 Otto Fischer, Evangelisches Pfarrerbuch der Mark Brandenburg seit der Reformation, 1941
 Paul Schwartz, Beiträge zur Kirchengeschichte brandenburgischer Städte, in Jahrbuch für Brandenburgische Kirchengeschichte 7/8 (1911), 
 Die evangelischen Pfarrer der Uckermark, bearbeitet von Herbert Lüpertz, weiterbearbeitet von Walter Arndt, Schriftenreihe der AMF No. 130

German Lutheran theologians
1559 births
1628 deaths
People from Zwickau